Hop Pole is a hamlet in the South Holland district of Lincolnshire, England. It is situated between Deeping St James and Deeping St Nicholas, and on the A1175 Littleworth Drove road.

No separate population statistic is available for Hop Pole. The best available report is for the whole Deeping St Nicholas civil parish  with a total of 1323 people within 505 dwellings.  There are approximately 40 homes in Hop Pole, around 105 people pro-rata.

Hop Pole falls within the drainage area of the Welland and Deepings Internal Drainage Board.
Hop Pole had three pubs: The Oat Sheaf Inn (closed 1957 and since demolished), The Blue Bell Inn (closed 2012 and now a motorhome stop-over site) and the Hop Pole Inn (closed in 1928 following the death of its long-serving landlord, Charles Stainsby).

References

External links

The Deepings
Hamlets in Lincolnshire
South Holland, Lincolnshire